Cuyahoga Valley Christian Academy (CVCA), founded in 1968, is a private, college-preparatory, non-denominational Christian school middle school and high school in Cuyahoga Falls, Ohio.

Academic Success
CVCA offers Academic support to those who need it through HOPE, for its middle school students and OASIS for its high school students.

Student Activity 
Co-curricular activities complement the CVCA curriculum by developing interests outside of scholastic achievement. These include Academic Challenge, Chess Club, history club, Christian Service Clubs, Forensics (Speech & Debate), Future Business Leaders of America, Internships, Language Clubs, Mission Trips, Performing Arts, BEST Robotics Team, Royal Theater, Short-Term Student Exchange Programs, Student Government, and Yearbook.  Student athletes can also choose from 14 sports in junior high and senior high school.

Ohio High School Athletic Association state championships 

 Boys Soccer – 2004, 2007, 2010
 Girls Track and Field – 2008, 2009
 Girls Cross Country – 2008
 Boys  Track and Field – 2018

Notable alumni
Ben Zemanski (soccer) – professional player for the Portland Timbers in Major League Soccer.
Ben Speas (soccer) – professional player for the Columbus Crew in Major League Soccer.
Justin "Harry" Lester (wrestling) – 2012 USA Olympic Wrestling Team, Men's Greco-Roman. Additionally, Lester was a four-time Ohio State Champion Wrestler. He is a two-time bronze medalist in the World Wrestling Championships.
Nathan Tomasello (wrestling) – 2015 NCAA Division I Wrestling champion, 4x NCAA All-American, 4x Big Ten Conference Wrestling Champion

External links 
 School Website

Notes and references 

Christian schools in Ohio
High schools in Summit County, Ohio
Private high schools in Ohio
Private middle schools in Ohio
Cuyahoga Falls, Ohio